Kregolišče is a small village in the Municipality of Sežana in the Littoral region of Slovenia, close to the border with Italy.

References

External links
Kregolišče on Geopedia

Populated places in the Municipality of Sežana